Shinsegae is a South Korean department store franchise, along with several other businesses, headquartered in Seoul, South Korea. The firm is an affiliate of Shinsegae Group, South Korea's leading retail chaebol, and one of the big three department store firms in Korea, along with Lotte and Hyundai Department Store.

Shinsegae was the first credit card company in South Korea. They issued their own charge card from 1967 to 2000. In 2000, Shinsegae sold their credit card division to KorAm Bank, which was later acquired by Citibank Korea.

Shinsegae was originally part of the Samsung Group, from which it separated in the 1990s along with CJ Group (Food/Chemicals/Entertainment), Saehan Group (Electronic Media/Apparel/Textiles), and the Hansol Group (Paper/Telecom). Chairwoman Lee Myung-hee is the fifth daughter of Samsung founder Lee Byung-chul and the aunt of Lee Jae-yong, the executive chairman of Samsung Electronics.

The group owns the brands Shinsegae and E-Mart, and is in direct competition with Lotte Shopping and Hyundai Department Store Group. Currently, it is the largest retailer in South Korea.

History
The main branch of Shinsegae is the oldest department store in Korea. It was opened in 1930 as the Gyeongseong branch of Mitsukoshi, a Japanese department store franchise; Korea was occupied by the Japanese Empire at the time. The store was acquired in 1945 by the late founder of Samsung group, Lee Byung-chull, and renamed Donghwa Department Store. After the Korean War (1950–1953) began, it was used for several years as a post exchange by the American army. In 1963, the store was given the name Shinsegae. The old building is currently used as a luxury shopping venue.

In 2021, Shinsegae bought the then-named SK Wyverns of the KBO League from SK and renamed then the SSG Landers. They bought them for 135.2 billion won, (100 billion for the team itself, and 35.2 billion for the team's facilities and properties) equivalent to $112.8 million.

Stores

Main Store (Main Building & New Building) (본점 본관, 신관) in Jung-gu, Seoul
Gangnam Store (Main Building & New Building) (강남점 본관, 신관) in Seocho-gu, Seoul the express bus terminal, flagship store turn-over 1billion USD per year top sales store of Shinsegae
Yeongdeungpo Store (Building A, Building B & Luxury Hall) (영등포점 A관, B관, 명품관) in Times Square, Yeongdeungpo-gu, Seoul
Gyeonggi Store (경기점) in Suji-gu, Yong-in, Gyeonggi-do (Changed its name from Jukjeon Store on October 26, 2009)
Shinsegae Centum City (신세계 센텀시티) in Centum City, Hae-undae-gu, Busan (the world's largest department store)
Masan Store (마산점) in Masan-Happo-gu, Changwon, Gyeongsangnam-do
Gwangju Shinsegae (광주신세계) in Seo-gu, Gwangju
Arario Chungcheong Store (충청점) in Dongnam-gu, Cheon-an, Chungcheongnam-do (Through a management alliance with Arario, owner of Yawoori Department Store, Shinsegae opened this branch in Cheon-an in the building once used as Galleria Cheon-an Store and Yawoori Department Store)
Uijeongbu Store (의정부점) in Uijeongbu, Gyeonggi-do
Hanam Store (하남점) in Hanam, Gyeonggi-do (Located in Starfield Hanam shopping mall, a joint-venture between Shinsegae and Taubman Centers, which opened on 9 September 2016. Besides Shinsegae, it also features Megabox cinema, Yeongpoong bookstore, Zara, H&M, Hansem, Electromart, emart traders (warehouse style), indoor water park and Eatopia food court as anchor tenant. Many luxury brand like Louis Vuitton, Prada, Gucci and Genesis and BMW CARS as well as Ioniq EV are in the shopping mall.)
Gimhae Store (김해점) in Gimhae, Gyeongsangnam-do
Daegu Shinsegae (대구신세계) in Dongdaegu Station, Daegu

Shinsegae also has a small branch in Incheon International Airport, and a supermarket in Dogok-dong, Gangnam-gu, Seoul.

Shinsegae launched the Shinsegae Style Market, a smaller shopping mall mainly aimed at young customers, in 2010. Despite its name, the mall is managed by Shinsegae's subsidiary E-Mart.
Seongnam Style Market in E-Mart Taepyeong branch, Seongnam, Gyeonggi-do
Daejeon Style Market in E-Mart Daejeon Terminal Complex branch, Dong-gu, Daejeon

Planned
A fashion mall for youngsters in the building of Mesa, a defunct shopping mall right beside Shinsegae's main store in Jung-gu, Seoul
 Shopping mall at Samsung Town, NW of Seoul new town is under construction

Defunct
Daegu Store (대구점) in Jung-gu, Daegu (opened in 1973 and closed in December 1976)
Shinsegae Store Banpo (신세계 스토어 반포) in Gangnam-gu, Seoul (opened in 1974 and closed several years later)
Gyeongju Bomun Store (경주보문점) in Gyeongju, Gyeongsangbuk-do (opened in 1979 and closed several years later)
Dongbang Plaza Store (동방플라자) in Jung-gu, Seoul (opened in 1982 and closed in 1996)
Cheonho Store (천호점) in Gangdong-gu, Seoul (closed in 2000, converted into E-Mart Cheonho Store)
Mia Store (미아점) in Seongbuk-gu, Seoul (closed in 2007, converted into E-Mart Mia Store)

Discount store
E-Mart (이마트) is a subsidiary of Shinsegae and a large discount store chain founded in South Korea, having stores in China, Korea and Mongolia. Domestically, E-Mart is the biggest discount store chain followed by Home Plus, and Lotte Mart.

In late May 2006, Shinsegae revealed plans to buy all 16 of the Wal-Mart stores in Korea. All of the country's Wal-Mart outlets were re-branded as E-Mart in October 2006. Wal-Mart exited the Korean market soon after.

Shinsegae spun off its E-Mart department into a separate corporation in 2012. The shopping mall was acquired by E-Mart in January 2014.

Online mall 

SSG (usually read as "쓱") is an online shopping mall operated by Shinsegae in 2014. Through this shopping mall, products from Shinsegae affiliates (Shinsegae Department Store, E-Mart, Casamia, CHICOR, etc.) can be shopped online.

Subsidiaries

Central City
E-Mart
 Gmarket Global (joint venture with eBay)
 Auction Co.
 G9
 G-Market
Gwangju Shinsegae
Seoul Express Bus Terminal
Shinsegae I&C
Shinsegae Chelsea
Shinsegae Construction
Shinsegae Dongdaegu CTC (Shinsehae Daegu)
Shinsegae Food System
Shinsegae International
Starbucks Coffee Korea
Johnny Rockets
Josun Hotel & Resort
Emart24
Casamia
Mindmark
 SILKWOOD
 Studio 329 
 CHICOR

Controversies
Shinsegae  banned  commercial images of actress Go Hyun-jung (고현정) from their department stores following her divorce from vice chairman and former CEO Chung Yong-jin.

See also
Westin Chosun Hotel
Hyundai Department Store Group
Homeplus

References

External links

Shinsegae Homepage
Shinsegae E-Mart Homepage
Shinsegae : Official Seoul City Tourism

Retail companies established in 1955
Companies listed on the Korea Exchange
Department stores of South Korea
Former Samsung subsidiaries
Shinsegae Group
South Korean companies established in 1955
Companies based in Seoul
Lee family (South Korea)